Fomena is one of the constituencies represented in the Parliament of Ghana. It elects one Member of Parliament (MP) by the first past the post system of election. Fomena is located in the Adansi North District of the Ashanti Region of Ghana.

Boundaries
The seat is located within the Adansi North district of the Ashanti Region of Ghana. This constituency has had five MPs since the beginning of the fourth republic.

Members of Parliament

Elections

See also
List of Ghana Parliament constituencies
List of political parties in Ghana

References 

Parliamentary constituencies in the Ashanti Region